The 2022–23 Rock Cup is a single-leg knockout tournament contested by clubs from Gibraltar, with twelve clubs participating.

Lincoln Red Imps are the defending champions, having defeated Bruno's Magpies in the final last season.

First round
The draw for the first round of this season's tournament was held on 12 December 2022. Manchester 62 received a bye to the quarter-finals by virtue of winning the GFA Challenge Trophy last season.

After the draw, 3 more teams received byes to the next round: Glacis United, St Joseph's and Lynx.

All kick off times are in CET.

Quarter-finals
The draw for the quarter-finals took place on 24 January 2023.

Semi-finals
The draw for the semi-finals took place on 23 February 2023. Kick-off dates and times are yet to be confirmed.

Scorers
4 goals

 Juanfri (Lincoln Red Imps)

3 goals

 Labra (Lions Gibraltar)

2 goals

 Joel David (Lions Gibraltar)
 Renan Bernardes (Mons Calpe)

1 goal

 Kyle Casciaro (Bruno's Magpies)
 Jack Storer (Bruno's Magpies)
 Tato (Bruno's Magpies)
 Jayce Olivero (Europa)
 Javi Paul (Europa)
 Anthony Celecia (Hound Dogs)
 Kike Gómez (Lincoln Red Imps)
 Juampe (Lincoln Red Imps)
 Kian Ronan (Lincoln Red Imps)
 Liam Walker (Lincoln Red Imps)
 Antonio Cintas (Lions Gibraltar)
 Charles Gaivizo (Lions Gibraltar)
 Thomas Hastings (Lions Gibraltar)
 Andre dos Santos (Mons Calpe)
 Sykes Garro (Mons Calpe)
 Manuel Caballero (St Joseph's)
 Pablo Rodríguez (St Joseph's)

Own goals

See also
2022–23 Gibraltar National League
2022–23 Gibraltar Intermediate League - Hound Dogs participate in this league.

References

External links
Gibraltar Football Association

Rock Cup
Rock Cup
Rock Cup